Calixa-Lavallée, named for the composer of the same name, is an off-island suburb of Montreal, in southwestern Quebec, Canada, east of Montreal in the Marguerite-D'Youville Regional County Municipality. The population as of the Canada 2011 Census was 504.

On December 6, 2014, Calixa-Lavallée changed from parish municipality to a (regular) municipality.

Demographics

Population

Language

See also
List of municipalities in Quebec

References

Municipalities in Quebec
Incorporated places in Marguerite-D'Youville Regional County Municipality
Greater Montreal